An intake is an opening or structure through which air/fluid is admitted to a space or machine.
Intake may also refer to:

Places

United Kingdom
 Intake, Doncaster, a suburb of Doncaster, South Yorkshire, England
 Intake, Sheffield, a residential area in Richmond, Sheffield, England
 Intake, County Londonderry, an archeological site in County Londonderry, Northern Ireland
 Intake, Leeds, a place in West Yorkshire, England: see List of United Kingdom locations: In-Ir#In

United States
 Intake, Montana, an unincorporated community in Dawson County, Montana
 Intake Creek, a creek near the former Weston, Washington

Other
 Intake (land), a parcel of land reclaimed from a moor
 Intake (video game), a 2013 game by Cipher Prime

See also
 Intack, a location in Lancashire, England